Varol Salman Tasar (born 4 October 1996) is a German professional footballer who plays as a forward for the Swiss club Aarau on loan from Luzern.

Career
Tasar made his senior debut in the Swiss Promotion League for Old Boys in 2015 before appearing in the 2. Liga Interregional with Klingnau the following season. After a successful season with Aarau in the Swiss Challenge League, Tasar signed a precontract with Servette on 13 February 2019.

On 7 October 2020, he moved to Luzern. For the 2020–21 season, the move was on the loan basis, followed by a permanent three-year contract thereafter.

On 26 August 2022, Tasar returned to Aarau on a season-long loan.

Personal life
Born in Germany, Tasar is of Turkish descent.

References

External links
 
 

1996 births
Living people
German people of Turkish descent
People from Waldshut-Tiengen
Sportspeople from Freiburg (region)
German footballers
Association football forwards
Swiss Super League players
Swiss Challenge League players
Swiss Promotion League players
2. Liga Interregional players
Servette FC players
FC Aarau players
FC Luzern players
BSC Old Boys players
German expatriate footballers
German expatriate sportspeople in Switzerland
Expatriate footballers in Switzerland
Footballers from Baden-Württemberg